Batanga Media was an independent digital media company serving the U.S. Hispanic and Latin American markets. Batanga Media's digital properties include Batanga.com, Batanga Radio, iMujer.com, and BolsadeMulher.com. Founded in 1999 by Troy McConnell, Luis Brandwayn and Jochen Fischer in North Carolina, Batanga Media is now headquartered in Miami, Florida with operations in 14 countries including Brazil, Chile, Colombia, Mexico, Peru, and Venezuela.

Batanga Radio was an online music streaming service owned and operated by Batanga Media. Batanga Radio users stream millions of songs per year and create over hundreds of thousands of custom stations every month. Batanga Radio was built to be an online radio application. Batanga Radio users can “tell” the application to add or remove certain artists, songs, genres and even decades of music. Batanga Radio's playlist technology reacts to user interactions and a user’s location. Song lyrics are  available on every song page and as every song plays. With every song that plays on Batanga Radio, users receive a list of five similar tracks to explore, listen to and/or add to their playlists. Using the songs and artists already chosen by users, the application identifies new songs that are similar. Batanga Radio is accessible across mobile and tablet devices. In 2016, Batanga Media and Discovery Networks became partners.

Using bRadio
A station is set by specifying an artist, song, or mood. Listeners can tune into hundreds of pre-made genre stations, tens of thousands of artist radio stations, or browse the entire music library directly in order to indicate musical preferences (songs can not be played directly). bRadio is available in both English and Spanish.

Listeners can indicate their preferences by directly responding to each track played, either favorably (by selecting the happy face button), or unfavorably (by selecting the sad face button), which determines if the track should be played, as well as how often similarly classified songs should be played on the station. Responding unfavorably to a track (selecting the sad face button) immediately stops playback of the track.

An artist, song, or mood can be excluded from playing entirely. Within the section located directly under the music player, titled "We Recommend You,” listeners can indicate which songs, artists, or moods to add or remove from their station by selecting the gray icon directly to the right of the words "We Recommend You.” This brings up a search bar where listeners can type in the name of a song, artist, or mood that can then either be added in order to provide variety to the listener’s station, or excluded from their station entirely.

Also, a blue plus sign appears on the lower right-hand corner of the album art for the track that is currently playing, and once this button is clicked, it brings up the choice: “Comprar,” (Spanish for “Buy”) which allows listeners to buy the song directly from iTunes. Upon clicking on the blue plus sign, registered users also have the option of voting on whether or not they like a song by selecting “me gusta” (smiley face), or “no me gusta.”

Mobile Devices
The Batanga Radio app is available across most mobile platforms and is available in both English and Spanish.

Batanga was available on the Google Android OS (for tablets and mobile phones, requires Android 2.1 and up).
Batanga was available across all iOS platforms, including iPhone, iPad, and iPod Touch.
Batanga was available on Blackberry (Operating System: 4.5.0 or higher).

The Batanga Radio app allows listeners to:  
Build customized stations  
Listen to an editorial station  
View lyrics
Like songs /dislike songs
Comment  
Add artist/song preferences 
Remove specific artists or songs from stations  
Read artist news 
View artist pages 
Explore similar tracks

Name change: Vix.com
In early 2017, Batanga Media announced the change of its name to Vix.com, and described their new editorial line and approach as follows: "We create content that sparks curiosity and adds value to millions of people every day. Our content lives in English, Spanish and Portuguese on Vix.com, and across a variety of social platforms such as Facebook, Instagram, and YouTube. With over 50 million social followers, our content reaches over 325 million people and our videos receive more than 1 billion views every month. We are proud to be the largest independent digital media content company for the U.S Hispanic market, Latin America and Brazil."

References

External links

 
Batanga Radio webapp
Batanga Media Site

Internet properties established in 1999
Companies based in Miami-Dade County, Florida
American music websites
Mobile software
Mobile web
1999 establishments in Florida